Chalcides guentheri, or Günther's cylindrical skink, is a species of skink, a lizard in the family Scincidae. The species is endemic to the Near East.

Etymology
The specific name, guentheri, is in honor of German-born British herpetologist Albert Günther.

Geographic range
C. guentheri is found in Israel, Lebanon, and parts of western Jordan and Syria.

Description
C. guentheri has no limbs.

Habitat
C. guentheri is usually found in woody or shrubby areas and cannot live in modified habitats. Members of the species may be found burrowing in grasses.

Reproduction
Sexually mature females of C. guentheri give birth to an average of three live young.

Conservation status
C. guentheri is suffering under major habitat loss as a result of agriculture in the area, and its population is in decline. It is protected by legislation in Israel.

References

Further reading
Boulenger GA (1887). Catalogue of the Lizards in the British Museum (Natural History). Second Edition. Volume III. ... Scincidæ ... London: Trustees of the British Museum (Natural History). (Taylor and Francis, printers). xii + 575 pp. + Plates I-XL. (Chalcides guentheri, new species, pp. 404–405).

Chalcides
Reptiles described in 1887
Taxa named by George Albert Boulenger